Colin Upton (born April 2, 1960) is a Canadian cartoonist and artist who was born in Winnipeg, Manitoba and grew up in Vancouver, British Columbia. Many of his comics are self-published in the minicomic format, although he has also had his work issued by commercial publishers such as Fantagraphics Books and included in anthology collections such as Drippytown Comics & Stories.  He is a co-host of the Inkstuds radio program, broadcast on CITR-FM at the University of British Columbia in Vancouver.

Since the mid-1980s, Upton has performed numerous times as a member of GX Jupitter-Larsen's noise band/performance art troupe The Haters. Upton's Happy Hater minicomics are based on the group's concepts and ideas.

Bibliography (selected) 
 Colin Upton's Big Thing (Ed Varney, 1990)
 Colin Upton's Other Big Thing (Fantagraphics, 1991)
 Colin Upton's Big Black Thing (Starhead Comix, 1994)
 Buddha on the Road (Aeon Publications, 1995–1997)
 The Totimorphous (Side-Show News & Co, 2006)
 9-11
 Colin Upton Comics
 Famous Bus Rides
 The Granville Street Gallery
 The Happy Hater
 Happy Ned
 Real Rubbie Comix
 Self-indulgent Comics
 Socialist Turtle

References

External links
 
 
 
 

Living people
1960 births
Canadian cartoonists
Minicomics
Artists from Winnipeg
Artists from Vancouver
American Splendor artists